Ikikileruk Creek is a stream in North Slope Borough, Alaska, in the United States. It flows to the Chukchi Sea.

Ikikileruk is derived from an Eskimo name meaning "narrow".

See also
List of rivers of Alaska

References

Rivers of North Slope Borough, Alaska
Rivers of Alaska